Tobías Albarracín (born December 5, 1984, in La Rioja) is an Argentine footballer who plays for Guarani Antonio Franco in the Primera B Nacional of Argentina.

References

External links
 
 Tobías Albarracín at Ceroacero.es
 

1984 births
Living people
Argentine expatriate footballers
Argentine footballers
Rampla Juniors players
Club Bolívar players
Expatriate footballers in Bolivia
Expatriate footballers in Uruguay
Association football defenders
Sportspeople from La Rioja Province, Argentina
Argentine expatriate sportspeople in Bolivia
Argentine expatriate sportspeople in Uruguay